Curland is a village and civil parish in Somerset, England, situated  south of Taunton in the Somerset West and Taunton district.  The village has a population of 225. The parish includes the hamlet of Abbey Hill.

Curland is home of a thriving equestrian centre.

History

The name Curland, which was Curiland in 1252, means land belonging to Curry.

Within the parish is Castle Neroche, a Norman motte-and-bailey castle on the site of an earlier hill fort.

Curland was part of the hundred of Abdick and Bulstone.

Governance

The parish council has responsibility for local issues, including setting an annual precept (local rate) to cover the council's operating costs and producing annual accounts for public scrutiny. The parish council evaluates local planning applications and works with the local police, district council officers, and neighbourhood watch groups on matters of crime, security, and traffic. The parish council's role also includes initiating projects for the maintenance and repair of parish facilities, as well as consulting with the district council on the maintenance, repair, and improvement of highways, drainage, footpaths, public transport, and street cleaning. Conservation matters (including trees and listed buildings) and environmental issues are also the responsibility of the council.

The village falls within the non-metropolitan district of Somerset West and Taunton, which was established on 1 April 2019. It was previously in the district of Taunton Deane, which was formed on 1 April 1974 under the Local Government Act 1972, and part of Taunton Rural District before that. The district council is responsible for local planning and building control, local roads, council housing, environmental health, markets and fairs, refuse collection and recycling, cemeteries and crematoria, leisure services, parks, and tourism.

Somerset County Council is responsible for running the largest and most expensive local services such as education, social services, libraries, main roads, public transport, policing and fire services, trading standards, waste disposal and strategic planning.

It is also part of the Taunton Deane county constituency represented in the House of Commons of the Parliament of the United Kingdom. It elects one Member of Parliament (MP) by the first past the post system of election. It was part of the South West England constituency of the European Parliament prior to Britain leaving the European Union in January 2020, which elected seven MEPs using the d'Hondt method of party-list proportional representation.

Religious sites

The parish Church of All Saints occupies a prominent position on a hill. It was rebuilt by Benjamin Ferrey in 1856, on the site of an earlier church, but closed in 1970.

The Curland Methodist Chapel has now been converted into a single dwelling.

References

External links

Villages in Taunton Deane
Civil parishes in Somerset